In mathematical physics, the Eckhaus equation – or the Kundu–Eckhaus equation – is a nonlinear partial differential equation within the nonlinear Schrödinger class:

The equation was independently introduced by Wiktor Eckhaus and by Anjan Kundu to model the propagation of waves in dispersive media.

Linearization

The Eckhaus equation can be linearized to the linear Schrödinger equation:

through the non-linear transformation:

The inverse transformation is:

This linearization also implies that the Eckhaus equation is integrable.

Notes

References

. Published in part in: 

 
 

Nonlinear partial differential equations
Schrödinger equation